Trichaphaenops is a genus of beetles in the family Carabidae, containing the following species:

 Trichaphaenops cerdonicus Abaille de Perrin, 1903
 Trichaphaenops crassicollis Jeannel, 1949
 Trichaphaenops gounellei Bedel, 1880
 Trichaphaenops raffaldianus Lemaire, 1981
 Trichaphaenops sollaudi Jeannel, 1916

References

Trechinae